Mindy Carson is an American former traditional pop vocalist. She was heard often on radio during the 1940s and 1950s.

Early years
Carson grew up in the Bronx, graduating from James Monroe High School. After graduation, she took a position as typist and stenographer, and she worked at a candy company.

Radio
In 1946, while still in her teens, Carson won an audition to the radio program Stairway to the Stars. This gave her a chance to perform for eight months in 1947, with Paul Whiteman's band and singer Martha Tilton, stars of the program. She joined the singing bandleader Harry Cool that year and made a number of recordings with him, one of which, "Rumors Are Flying", made the chart.

Although she failed to score a chart hit recording during the next four years, she did receive much radio exposure. She was heard on Guy Lombardo's syndicated program in the late 1940s and her own variety program which began on the CBS Network in 1949. She also had her own thrice-weekly program, sponsored by the U.S. Army, in 1950. She was widely promoted as one of the guests on the November 5, 1950 premiere of NBC's The Big Show, hosted by Tallulah Bankhead.

Television
Beginning in 1949, Carson was a regular for two years on Florian Zabach's NBC television variety program. On December 30, 1952 she began the Mindy Carson Show, sponsored by Embassy cigarettes, on NBC.

Recordings

In 1949, Carson signed with RCA Victor. Although her initial recordings for RCA Victor failed to sell well, the success of Eileen Barton's novelty hit "If I Knew You Were Coming I'd've Baked a Cake" prompted the company to try a similar recording for Mindy Carson. Her recording of "Candy and Cake" was backed with "My Foolish Heart" and the record became a rare  two-sided hit. However, after a number of unsuccessful follow-up recordings, RCA Victor dropped her in 1952.

Carson then moved to Columbia Records, and her duet with Guy Mitchell, "Cause I Love You That's-A-Why", climbed on the charts to the top 25. She also guest-starred on ABC's 1957 series The Guy Mitchell Show. "All the Time and Everywhere", a big hit in the United Kingdom for Dickie Valentine, went nowhere for Carson and other U.S. recording artists. A cover of The Gaylords' big hit "Tell Me You're Mine" charted at No. 22, and a few others made the top 30 in 1952, 1953 and 1954.

Her song "Memories Are Made of This" with the Ray Conniff Orchestra was issued in 1955.

In August 1955, she scored a hit when her recording of "Wake the Town and Tell the People" reached No. 13, despite the fact that the trends in popular music were moving to rock and roll and she was not generally a rock singer. Carson had a minor hit with "The Fish", the single prior to "Wake The Town...", which was a mild rocker based on a proposed dance craze. The record appeared in both the Cashbox and Music Vendor retail surveys. She had only one more hit, Ivory Joe Hunter's "Since I Met You Baby" in 1957. By 1960, her recording career was over.

Broadway
In 1958, she appeared on Broadway in The Body Beautiful by Sheldon Harnick and Jerry Bock, their first musical collaboration. Carson returned to Broadway in the 1960s in two comedies, Mary, Mary (1961–64) and Dinner at Eight (1966-67).

Clubs
In 1949, Carson became the youngest performer to receive top billing at New York City's Copacabana nightclub. She also performed at clubs in New Orleans, Baltimore, and other cities.

Personal life
Carson married music publisher Eddie Joy in September 1949. They had three daughters, Jenny, Jody and Cathy.

References

External links
JC Marion's Interlude Era: Mindy Carson

Living people
American women singers
Singers from New York City
RCA Victor artists
Traditional pop music singers
Date of birth missing (living people)
People from the Bronx
21st-century American women
Year of birth missing (living people)
Signature Records artists
Columbia Records artists